Juan Antonio Iribarren Cabezas (7 May 1885 – 11 April 1968) was a Chilean politician. He was president of Chile from 17 October to 3 November 1946.

Biography
He studied at the Liceo de La Serena and then at the University of Chile, graduating as a lawyer.

He was president of the pro-homage committee to Gabriela Mistral, which contributed to the formation of the Centro Cultural Gabriela Mistral in Vicuña, now called Gabriela Mistral Museum of Vicuña.

President Juan Antonio Rios the year 1942 appointed him education minister.

After the death of President Rios, Vice President Alfredo Duhalde called for new presidential elections, after which he left his office to Juan Antonio Iribarren under pressure from Gabriel Gonzalez Videla.

He taught at the law school of the University of Chile, in the chair of General History of Law from 1918 to 1954. He died on Santiago, Chile, in 11 April 1968.

References

1885 births
1968 deaths
People from Elqui Province
Chilean people of Basque descent
Radical Party of Chile politicians
Presidents of Chile
Vice presidents of Chile
Government ministers of Chile
Date of death missing
Place of death missing